Aguacatán is a town and municipality in the Guatemalan department of Huehuetenango. The municipality has a population of 49,607 (2018 census) and covers an area of 287 km².

Geography
Aguacatán is set in a mountainous area. From the central market, a walk of six blocks will put you in farmland.

Aguacatán was served primarily by dirt roads cutting through the mountains. The dirt road suffered from erosion, potholes and landslides. The paving of the roads to Huehuetenango and Sacapulas and Nebaj was completed in 2006. It now links Aguacatán to the Pan American Highway (near Huehuetenango), and to markets and opportunities for economic growth.

The Nacimiento del Rio San Juan is a natural spring where water pours up out of a small pool. The pool is surrounded by pipes that tap into the water supply. Irrigation from the spring explains the prolific agriculture in the area. The Nacimiento has a park with benches and a two-story observation area.

Demographics
Aguacatán is the only municipality in the world in which Awakateko is the native language. In outlying areas, even just a walk uphill to Aldea San Miguel or up the mountain road to Chex, the native language is Kʼicheʼ. Awakateko is spoken in some other aldeas, including Llano Coyote, near Rio San Juan. Awakateko and Kʼicheʼe' are both Mayan languages. Other languages spoken in the municipality are Mam and Chalchitek. Spanish is also spoken by most residents.

Principal religions are Roman Catholic and Evangelicalism.

Economy
A central market is open most days. Bus service connects Aguacatán to Huehuetenango and other cities. Internet and telephone services are available.

Poor economic conditions have prompted some residents to travel for work to other parts of Guatemala, and also to Mexico and the United States. Some have settled in Tuscarawas County, Ohio.

History
Aguacatán suffered much violence during the Civil War, especially in the early 1980s. The aldea of Chex was attacked, and is now five sub-communities.

In the elections of December 30, 2003, 11 candidates challenged the incumbent mayor. The election results were disputed, a rally of most residents called for a new election, and the mayor closed city offices and operations for months.

Climate

Aguacatán has a subtropical highland climate (Köppen: Cwb).

References

External links

Muni in Spanish
Photos of Nacimiento del Rio San Juan
Richard Renner's 2006 photos of Aguacatán
Richard Renner's 2004 photos of Aguacatán
Photos of 2002 church dedication in Chex

Municipalities of the Huehuetenango Department